Reality Check is the debut album of Punjabi singer, Jassi Sidhu, released in 2003. It's his first album after he left his band, B21, in 2002. The album saw the departure of B21 sound and thus, paving the path for an exciting new sound by Jassi Sidhu. The album also opened the doors of success for Jassi in India, where, earlier, he was an unknown face. Reality Check was a commercial hit, both in U.K. and India.

Difference between International and Indian edition

Reality Check was released as "Ishq Vich Jogi" in India on 28 June 2003 under the label, Nupur Audio. The Indian version had only 8 tracks, and the two tracks which were missing, were the versions of "Chargay Jawani". Moreover, there were title changes and track number changes in the Indian version.

Track lists of both the versions are given below. Name changes are accompanied by real track names in brackets in Indian version track list.

Track listing

2003 debut albums